Ukrainians in Serbia refers to a Ukrainian ethnic minority in Serbia. They are officially recognized as an independent and full-fledged national minority, which is represented through the National Council of the Ukrainian National Minority. They mostly live in the region of Vojvodina, in the areas of Bačka and Syrmia. They speak Ukrainian and use Ukrainian Cyrillic script. According to the 2011 census, 4,903 members of the Ukrainian minority live in Serbia, which is 0.07% of the total population. The most important cultural and educational organization of Ukrainians in Serbia is the Society for Ukrainian Language, Literature and Culture "Prosveta" (Prosvita).

The Ukrainian national community in Serbia (in addition to ethnic Ukrainians in the narrow sense) also includes the pro-Ukrainian part of the Rusyns, who declare themselves as Rusyns-Ukrainians, and who are gathered around the Alliance of Rusyns-Ukrainians of Serbia. The mentioned Rusyn-Ukrainians, who are considered to be the Rusyn branch of the Ukrainian people, should not be confused with the ethnic Rusyns, who declare themselves to be members of a separate Rusyn ethnicity.

The realization of the minority rights of the Ukrainian community in Serbia is a special area of mutual cooperation within the relations between Serbia and Ukraine.

History 
In the middle of the 18th century, during the Habsburg rule, the process of immigration of the East Slavic population to the area of the then southern Hungary (now Vojvodina, Serbia) began. A part of the population that moved to the Habsburg monarchy after the abolition of the regional self-government in Zaporizhzhia (1775), settled around 1785 in the southern Hungarian areas, and mostly in the Banat Potisje. Although part of that population later returned to their old homeland, during the 19th century there were occasional arrivals of new immigrants, among whom the awareness of the origin from the Ukrainian territory was preserved.

At that time, the national development of the non-Hungarian peoples in Hungary was hampered by the state authorities, who promoted the policy of magyarization. According to the practice of that time, the Austro-Hungarian authorities classified the entire East Slavic population under the term Ruthenians (Ruthenen). When the Ukrainian national idea rose in eastern Galicia, people of Ukrainian descent from other parts of the monarchy joined the movement.

The Ukrainian idea also influenced some Carpathian Rusyns, and among the Rusyn leaders from the southern Hungarian regions who joined the Ukrainian national movement in the early 20th century was the Greek Catholic priest Havryyil Kostelnyk, a native of Ruski Krstur. His example will be followed later by some other Rusyn community leaders.

After the dissolution of Austria-Hungary (1918) and the creation of the Kingdom of Serbs, Croats and Slovenes (Yugoslavia), more favorable circumstances arose for the development of the Ukrainian community, which was further strengthened during the Interwar period (1918-1941) following the collapse of the Ukrainian People's Republic which led to increased Ukrainian immigration to Yugoslavia. The activities of Ukrainian political immigrants were marked by frequent disputes with influential Russian political immigrants, which indirectly affected the situation among local Ukrainians, and relations within the wider East Slavic community in Yugoslavia became even more complex due to some specific processes among the local Rusyns.

During the Interwar period, the Ukrainian community expanded to include several Rusyn leaders alongside the Ukrainian national movement, resulting in a division into two currents within the then Rusyn People's Educational Society (RNPD), founded in 1919, the first of which advocated preservation of the Rusyn national identity, while the other advocated the full integration of the Rusyns into the Ukrainian national corps. Under the influence of the then Greek Catholic bishop of Križevci, Dionisije Njaradi, who was a supporter of the ukrainization of all Rusyns (both Pannonian and Carpathian), local Rusyns were gradually removed from important positions in the RNPD, and pro-Ukrainian immigrants were appointed in their place.

Due to a series of unresolved issues in the relations between the two communities, Ukrainian and Rusyn, after World War II, a decision was made to classify them in a common census category, so that Rusyns and Ukrainians were shown together in the 1948, 1953 and 1961 censuses, but that practice was then abandoned, starting with the 1971 census. The issue of relations between Ukrainians and Rusyns has been discussed on several occasions at various levels of government in the former Yugoslavia, especially in the area of exercising various minority rights, which related to the use of language and script, which was of particular importance in the field of school education in the mother tongue.

Present day 
A significant turning point in the history of the Ukrainian community in Serbia occurred in 1990, when the representatives of Ukrainians in the former Yugoslavia reached an agreement with the pro-Ukrainian part of the Rusyns, which led to the creation of a joint organization called the Alliance of Rusyns-Ukrainian. In contrast, another part of the Rusyns, who advocated the preservation of the Rusyn identity, formed its own organization at the end of the same year under the name: Matica rusinska. The creation of the mentioned, clearly profiled organizations marked the beginning of a new phase in the process of differentiation within the Rusyn community, which was definitely divided into two currents: national (gathered around Matica rusinska) and pro-Ukrainian (gathered around the Alliance of Rusyns-Ukrainians).

After the breakup of Yugoslavia and the Soviet Union (1991-1992), the Ukrainian community in Serbia became more directly connected with Ukraine, which after gaining independence took care of the Ukrainian people in the diaspora. Within the wider Ukrainian community in Serbia, the pro-Ukrainian part of the Rusyns, which was gathered together with the Ukrainians in the Alliance of Rusyns-Ukrainian, received special support from the state and educational institutions of Ukraine in charge of working with the diaspora.

The adoption of new legal solutions on the exercise of minority rights in the then Federal Republic of Yugoslavia (2002) created the preconditions for the formation of national councils as special bodies of minority self-government. On that occasion, the question arose, whether the Rusyns and the Ukrainians will be represented in the joint national council or each community will form its own council. Based on the results of the 2002 census, two councils were formed, and the first electoral assembly of the Ukrainian National Council was held on 17 May 2003 in Kula.

Since the pro-Ukrainian part of the Rusyn leaders in Serbia, through the Alliance of Rusyns-Ukrainians, opted for the Ukrainian national identity, a special subgroup of Rusyns-Ukrainians was created within the wider Ukrainian community in Serbia which continue to nurture their Rusyn identity which they consider a branch of the Ukrainian ethnicity. Their pro-Ukrainian Rusynism differs from national Rusynism, which is nurtured among members of the Rusyn people. Over time, the pro-Ukrainian part of the Rusyn ethnicity was fully integrated into the Ukrainian national corps within the Alliance of Rusyn-Ukrainians.

Unlike the mentioned Rusyn-Ukrainians, who are part of the Ukrainian ethnicity, ethnic Rusyns in Serbia are still considered part of a separate Rusyn ethnicity, which has its own minority organizations. The uniqueness of the Rusyn people is officially recognized in Serbia and some other countries, but not in Ukraine, which still does not recognize the national uniqueness of the Rusyns.

Although the activities of Ukrainian organizations in Serbia are primarily aimed at developing their own national community, without challenging and endangering the equal rights of other minority communities, in some Ukrainian circles there are occasional tendencies to deny the ethnic identity of Rusyns. Referring to the mentioned phenomena, a former Yugoslav diplomat and one of the prominent Rusyns, Mihajlo Hornjak, stated in 2005 that "to tell a Rusyn that he is Ukrainian is the same as to tell a Ukrainian that he is Russian".

Following the Russian invasion of Ukraine, Serbian refugee commissioner Vladimir Cucić stated that 5,698 refugees from Ukraine had registered their stay in Serbia.

As stated by the Ministry of Internal Affairs of Serbia, between February 24 and November 2, 2022, around 22,709 Ukrainian citizens have registered residence in Serbia. These numbers include all temporary passing residence and registered refugees, including statistics from required registration after 90 days of visa free residence. Because of this, actual number of residence with Ukrainian citizenship is smaller from the statistical numbers given my the Ministry of Internal Affairs.

Ukrainian language in Serbia 
Ukrainians in Serbia speak their mother tongue, Ukrainian, which is officially recognized by state authorities as the language of the Ukrainian minority community. As part of the implementation of the European Charter for Regional or Minority Languages, which was ratified in Serbia in 2006, the status of the Ukrainian language as a full-fledged minority language was confirmed, which is one of the basic identity features of the Ukrainian people in Serbia.

Despite that, the official recognition of Ukrainian as a minority language in Serbia is not fully respected in the practice of the Matica Srpska Library and the National Library of Serbia, which are entrusted with the primary cataloging (CIP) of all publications published in the Republic of Serbia. In the practice of the mentioned institutions, UDC number for Ukrainian literature in Serbia is actually the number for Rusyn literature in Serbia. This practice is incorrect according to the literary work of Ukrainians in Serbia, since the number belonging to them and their literature is used to denote a bibliographic category in whose name the Ukrainian name is not even mentioned.

Demographics 
Prior to the 1971 census, Ukrainians were classified together with the Rusyns:

Religion 
According to the results of the 2011 census, 94.76% of the Ukrainians in Serbia belong to Christian denominations. Out of that number, 57.56% are Eastern Orthodox, 36.14% Greek-Catholics, 0.57% Protestants and 0.08% members of other Christian communities.

See also 

 Serbia-Ukraine relations
 Serbs in Ukraine
 Russians in Serbia

References

Citations

Sources

 
 
 
 
 
 
 
 
 
 
 
 
 
 
 
 
 
 
 

Serbia–Ukraine relations
Ethnic groups in Serbia
Ukrainian diaspora in Europe